

The following properties in Newton, Massachusetts are listed on the National Register of Historic Places. They are a subset of all properties in Middlesex County. There are over 180 places listed in Newton.

 The 13 villages are: 
Auburndale
Chestnut Hill
Newton Centre (spelled Newton Center by the MBTA, but not by the city)
Newton Corner
Newton Highlands
Newton Lower Falls
Newton Upper Falls
Newtonville
Nonantum
Oak Hill
Thompsonville
Waban
West Newton

Current listings

|}

Notes on Zip Codes used
Most villages have their own Zip Codes, but some do not. To further add to the confusion, the Zip Codes do not always coincide with the village boundaries which are "unofficial" according to the city. Most residents, though, seem to know exactly where the village lines are.

The following ZIP Codes are present:

a  Chestnut Hill Zip Code 02467 extends into Brookline. There are two non-contiguous parts of Newton in this Zip Code but they are joined together by the Brookline part.
b  Nonantum does not have its own Zip Code. It uses Newton 02458, which is for Newton Corner. Historic Place listings for Nonantum are assigned to Newton Corner.
c  Oak Hill does not have its own Zip Code, It uses Newton 02459, which is for Newton Centre.
d  Thompsonville does not have its own Zip Code. It uses Newton 02459 from Newton Centre (or Center), but it also on the border of Chestnut Hill Newton. No listings have been determined to be in Thompsonville, but it is possible that one or more Newton Centre listings may actually be in Thompsonville.

See also
National Register of Historic Places listings in Middlesex County, Massachusetts
List of National Historic Landmarks in Massachusetts

References

 
Newton
Newton, Massachusetts